Lidoflazine is a piperazine calcium channel blocker. It is a coronary vasodilator with some antiarrhythmic action. Lidoflazine was discovered at Janssen Pharmaceutica in 1964.

Physical properties

Solubility  at room temperature

Extracted from

Synthesis
Compare for Ranolazine.

Alkylation of N-carbethoxypiperazine [120-43-4] (1) with 1-[4-chloro-1-(4-fluorophenyl)butyl]-4-fluorobenzene [3312-04-7] (2) gives CID:12679861 (3). Deprotection of which afforded 1-[4,4-bis(4-fluorophenyl)butyl]piperazine [5631-35-6].
Acylation of 2,6-xylidine (4) with chloroacetyl chloride (5) gives N-chloroacetyl-2,6-xylidine [1131-01-7] (6). 
The convergent synthesis between the above two counterparts completed the synthesis of lidoflazine (7).

References

Further reading 

 

Piperazines
HERG blocker
Calcium channel blockers
Acetanilides
Fluoroarenes
Janssen Pharmaceutica
Belgian inventions